Tom Green (born 6 February 1974 in Durban, South Africa) is a field hockey defence or midfield player from Canada, who started playing field hockey at the age of eight. The resident of Vancouver, British Columbia earned his first cap in and against India (1-1).

International senior competitions
 1998 – Commonwealth Games, Kuala Lumpur (not ranked)
 2000 – Sultan Azlan Shah Cup, Kuala Lumpur (7th)
 2000 – Americas Cup, Cuba (2nd)
 2001 – World Cup Qualifier, Edinburgh (8th)

References 

1974 births
Living people
South African people of British descent
Canadian male field hockey players
Canadian people of British descent
Sportspeople from Durban
Field hockey players from Vancouver
South African emigrants to Canada